Cees Jan Winkel (born 10 June 1962) is a retired freestyle swimmer from the Netherlands. He competed at the 1980 Summer Olympics in three events and finished seventh in the 4 × 100 m medley relay.

References

1962 births
Living people
Dutch male freestyle swimmers
Olympic swimmers of the Netherlands
Swimmers at the 1980 Summer Olympics
Swimmers from The Hague